The 2021 British Athletics Championships was the national championships in outdoor track and field for athletes in the United Kingdom, which also served as the main qualifying event for athletics competitors for the delayed 2020 Summer Olympics. In addition, the Championships included a number of parasports events, with a total of 36 competitors in these competitions. On 29 June 2021, UK Athletics announced 65 athletes that would compete for Team GB at the Olympics, taking the total number of British athletics competitors at the Games to 72. In July 2021, four more athletes qualified for the Games based on their World Athletics rankings.

Background

The 2021 British Athletics Championships were held between 25 and 27 June 2021 at the Manchester Regional Arena. Manchester has the rights to host the Championships from 2020 until 2022. Due to COVID-19 pandemic related capacity limits, the number of fans were limited to 1,500 per day. 

The Championships served as the trial event for competitors to qualify for the 2020 Summer Olympics. In order to guarantee selection for the Olympics, competitors had to finish in the top two places at the Championships, and also have achieved the Olympic qualification standard. UK Athletics then awarded any unfilled selections with competitors of their choice. 

Olympic qualification for the marathon and 20 kilometres race walk events were determined following a separate trial event in Kew Gardens, London, in March 2021. A separate 10,000 metres qualification event was held on 5 April in Birmingham, as part of the 2021 European 10,000m Cup. Typically, the Night of 10,000m PBs event in Highgate, London, is used as the British Championships event for this distance, but that event was cancelled in 2021 due to the COVID-19 pandemic. After Mo Farah failed to reach the Olympic qualifying standard at the 10,000 metres trial event, UK Athletics decided to organise a one-off event at the 2021 British Athletics Championships, to give Farah a final chance to qualify for the Olympics. The competition contained international runners and pacemakers.

The Championships also included a number of parasports events. The events included were the 100 metres and 400 metres mixed classes races, as well as shot put, discus, long jump, high jump and javelin field events. A total of 36 athletes competed, some of whom had been included in the British squad for the delayed 2020 Summer Paralympics the previous week.

For the first time in the 21st century, the British Athletics Championships were not broadcast on live television, as the BBC and UK Athletics did not reach a broadcasting rights deal. The Championships were instead broadcast on the UK Athletics website and YouTube channel. Several athletes including Dina Asher-Smith were critical of this decision.

On 29 June 2021, UK Athletics announced 65 athletes to compete for Team GB at the delayed 2020 Summer Olympics, based on performances at the Championships. Including the marathon and 20 km walk competitors, it meant that 72 Britons were chosen to compete in athletics at the Games. On 2 July 2021, four more athletes were awarded places by World Athletics, based on their rankings.

Highlights

Mo Farah finished the 10,000 metres race in a time of 27:47.04, 19 seconds slower than the Olympic qualification standard. As such, he failed to qualify for the Olympic 10,000 metres event. 

The women's 800 metres race featured five athletes who had previously attained the Olympic qualifying standard: Jemma Reekie, Laura Muir, Alexandra Bell, Keely Hodgkinson and Adelle Tracey. Hodgkinson finished first, in a time of 1:59:61. Reekie finished second and Muir was the third finisher. Muir was initially selected alongside Hodgkinson and Reekie for the Games, though she later decided not to compete in the 800 metres event at the Olympics, as she wanted to focus on the 1500 metres race. Her place was reallocated to Alexandra Bell. 

Pole vaulter Holly Bradshaw was aiming for her ninth British title, and seventh in a row.

Dina Asher-Smith won the women's 100 metre event. She was originally clocked in a national record time of 10.71 seconds, although this was later corrected to 10.97 seconds, which did not beat the previous record. Asher-Smith qualified to compete in the 100 and 200 metres individual events, and the 4 x 100 metres relay. 

Jodie Williams won the 200 and 400 metres races, the first time since 2005 that a woman has won both events. 

The men's 800 metres race was a close finish, with the top three separated by 0.03 seconds. Elliot Giles won the event, ahead of Oliver Dustin and Daniel Rowden. All three athletes were later selected for the Olympics.

Results
Key: Q – qualified for the 2020 Summer Olympics.

Men

In addition, Adam Gemili, Zharnel Hughes, Richard Kilty, Nethaneel Mitchell-Blake, Reece Prescod and CJ Ujah were selected for the men's 4 x 100 metres relay. Niclas Baker, Cameron Chalmers, Matthew Hudson-Smith, Michael Ohioze and Lee Thompson were chosen for the men's 4 x 400 metres relay.

Women

In addition, Dina Asher-Smith, Beth Dobbin, Imani-Lara Lansiquot, Daryll Neita, Ashleigh Nelson and Asha Philip were selected for the women's 4 x 100 metres relay. Zoey Clark, Emily Diamond, Jessie Knight, Laviai Nielsen, Ama Pipi, Jessica Turner, Hannah Williams, Jodie Williams and Nicole Yeargin were selected for the women's 4 x 400 metres relay.

Parasports – Men

Note: UK Athletics only published results for parasport track events. No results for field events were published.

Parasports – Women

Note: UK Athletics only published results for parasport track events. No results for field events were published.

Other Olympic trials
Key: Q – qualified for the 2020 Summer Olympics.

Men

In addition, Callum Hawkins was pre-selected for the marathon event prior to the trial event. Sam Atkin was additionally selected for the 10,000 metres race.

Women

The two remaining places for the marathon were awarded to Jess Piasecki and Stephanie Twell, neither of whom participated at the trial event. No British women were selected for the 20km walk event at the 2020 Summer Olympics.

Notes

References

2021
British Outdoor Championships
Athletics Outdoor
Athletics Championships
Sports competitions in Manchester